

Hans Seidemann (18 January 1901 – 21 December 1967) was a German general during World War II. He was a recipient of the Knight's Cross of the Iron Cross with Oak Leaves of Nazi Germany.

From April 1928 to October 1929, Seidemann was trained as a Luftwaffe pilot at the secret training facility in Lipetsk, Soviet Union. He also participated in the third and fourth FAI International Tourist Plane Contest Challenge 1932 (7th place) and Challenge 1934 (3rd place).

By the mid 1930s Seidemann was a renowned air racer and won the 1937 London - Isle of Man Air Race.

Awards
 Spanish Cross in Gold with Swords (6 June 1939)
 Iron Cross (1939)  2nd Class (25 September 1939) & 1st Class (20 May 1940)
 Knight's Cross of the Iron Cross with Oak Leaves
 Knight's Cross on 20 March 1942 as Oberst im Generalstab and chief of the general staff of Luftflotte 2
 658th Oak Leaves on 18 November 1944 as Generalleutnant and commanding general of VIII. Fliegerkorps

References

Citations

Bibliography

External link

1901 births
1967 deaths
People from Prignitz
Luftwaffe World War II generals
Recipients of the Knight's Cross of the Iron Cross with Oak Leaves
German World War II pilots
Condor Legion personnel
Generals of Aviators
20th-century Freikorps personnel
Military personnel from Brandenburg
Air racing champions
German air racers